Eburia bimaculata is a species of beetle in the family Cerambycidae found in Antigua and Barbuda.

References

bimaculata
Beetles described in 1912